WNNA (106.1 FM, "Hanna 92.3 & 106.1") is a radio station broadcasting a classic hits format. Licensed to Beaver Springs, Pennsylvania, United States, the station is currently owned by Seven Mountains Media, through licensee Southern Belle, LLC. It serves areas west of Selinsgrove. It features programming from Westwood One. It is part of a simulcast with WHNA 92.3 FM Riverside.

History
On March 5, 2018, WNNA changed their format from country (as "Bigfoot Country") to a simulcast of classic hits-formatted WHNA 92.3 FM Riverside.

Coverage area
WNNA serves the area west of WHNA, including western Snyder County, eastern Juniata County, and northern Perry County. The towns of McClure, Thompsontown, and Millerstown are included.

See also
 WCFT-FM (heard on HD2)
 WHNA

References

External links

Classic hits radio stations in the United States
NNA
Snyder County, Pennsylvania
Radio stations established in 1993
1993 establishments in Pennsylvania